Rezvan (also Romanized as Rezvān and Reẕvān) is a village in Kharajgil Rural District, Asalem District, Talesh County, Gilan Province, Iran. At the 2006 census, its population was 37, in 10 families.

References 

Populated places in Talesh County